|}
Richard Soon Huat Lim (born 23 December 1946) is a former Australian politician. He was the Country Liberal Party member for Greatorex in the Northern Territory Legislative Assembly from 1994 until his resignation in 2007.

Lim was born in Malaysia, but moved to Australia to study medicine. He worked as a medical general practitioner before his election to the Legislative Assembly. He served a period as the CLP's deputy leader, but resigned his seat in 2007, prompting a by-election which was won by Matt Conlan.

References

1946 births
Living people
Members of the Northern Territory Legislative Assembly
Country Liberal Party members of the Northern Territory Legislative Assembly
Malaysian emigrants to Australia
Australian anaesthetists
20th-century Australian medical doctors
21st-century Australian politicians